The battles of the Mexican–American War include all major engagements and most reported skirmishes, including Thornton's Defeat, the Battle of Palo Alto, and the Battle of Resaca de la Palma, which took place prior to the official start of hostilities.

Background
The Mexican–American War lasted from 1846 until 1848. It grew out of unresolved border disputes between the Republic of Texas and Mexico after the United States annexed Texas nine years after the Texas Revolution. It ended in 1848 with the Treaty of Guadalupe Hidalgo in which Mexico was forced to sell a vast tract of land that amounted to almost half its national territory to the United States.

List of battles
<onlyinclude>
Key
(A) – American Victory
(M) – Mexican Victory
(I) – Inconclusive

1846

1847

1848

See also
James Polk
Mexican–American War campaigns

Notes

 Combined official Mexican losses and the US estimates Northern Campaign (Palo Alto-Buena Vista): c. 1,031 Mexican killed. Valley Campaign (Cerro Gordo-Mexico City): c. 2,854 Mexican were killed. Or, c. 3,885 not including later died of wounds, died from disease, or the losses in the West.
 The Mexican Cavalry Division (Army of the South) escaped the Valley Campaign largely intact (4,000 evacuated Mexico City). Of some 16,000 Infantry of the Armies of the East & North, only 5,000 evacuated Mexico City.

References
 
 Brooks, N.C. Complete History Of The Mexican War: Grigg, Elliot & Co.Philadelphia 1849
 Listing of 1846–1848 US Army Casualties
 Ramsey, Albert C. The Other Side or Notes For The History of The War Between Mexico And The United States John Wiley New York 1850
 The Occupation of New Mexico (Battle of Cañoncito)

External links
 A Continent Divided: The U.S. - Mexico War, Center for Greater Southwestern Studies, the University of Texas at Arlington

Lists of battles by war
 United States military-related lists